Shoreham-Wading River High School is a public secondary school located in Shoreham, New York. The school serves about 800 students in grades 9 to 12 in the Shoreham-Wading River Central School District.

Overview
The school colors are navy blue and gold, and the mascot is the wildcat. The North Shore Public Library is connected to the school building.

The Wildcat Pause, the school's official newspaper, has 
won many awards over the years.

Among the school's second language courses is American Sign Language.  Several advanced placement courses are offered as well, including AP US History, AP Calculus AB and AP Computer Science A.

Notable alumni

D. B. Sweeney, actor
Keith Osik, Major League Baseball player
Jesse Jantzen, NCAA Wrestling Champion
Adam Conover, stand-up comedian
Carter Rubin, singer, winner of Season 19 of NBC's The Voice
Karen Sillas, actor
Eric Anthony Lopez, actorThe Phantom of The Opera on Broadway & Disney’s Chang Can Dunk Film

Athletics
The Shoreham-Wading River Boys' Cross Country team won the NYS Class B Championships in 2007.

Shoreham-Wading River lacrosse has established itself as a powerhouse program since the program was founded in the late 1990s. In 2006–2007, the boys' and girls' lacrosse teams won the NYS Class C Championship. They became only the second school to win both the boys' and girls' New York state championships in the same year; the other school was Garden City in 2001. The girls' and boys' teams would do this for a second time in the 2011–2012 season. The boys also won the State Championship in 2002 and 2019, while the girls would repeat in 2008, 2009 and 2010.

In 2014, the Wildcats captured the first Rutgers Cup in school history (an award given to the best public football team on Long Island) alongside their very first Long Island championship and finished the season with a perfect record of 12–0. In 2014, Thomas Cutinella, a member of Shoreham-Wading River High School's varsity football team, died of a head injury sustained during a routine play in a football game at John Glenn High School in Elwood. Shoreham-Wading River High School later dedicated its main athletic field Thomas Cutinella Memorial Field in his honor.

References

History. Shoreham-Wading River Central School District. Retrieved on 19 April 2008.
http://www.dyestat.com//?pg=us-2008-NXN-New-York-Region-TeamRankings

External links

Brookhaven, New York
Educational institutions established in 1975
Public high schools in New York (state)
Schools in Suffolk County, New York
1975 establishments in New York (state)